The Thanh Hóa Stadium is a multi-use stadium in Thanh Hóa, Vietnam.  It is currently used mostly for football matches and is the home stadium of Thanh Hóa F.C. of the V.League 1.  The stadium holds 14,000 spectators.

References

External links
 Stadium information

Thanh Hóa
Football venues in Vietnam
Thanh Hóa FC (1962)